A hexamer is a type of oligomer in chemistry and biochemistry that mostly consists of six similar or identical repeating units.

Hexamer may also refer to people with the surname Hexamer:

 Charles John Hexamer (1862-1921) co-founder and president of the National German-American Alliance.
 Ernest Hexamer (1827-1912), German civil engineer and originator of the system of fire insurance maps
 William Hexamer (1825–1870), German revolutionary and participant in the American Civil War